Janika is a given name. The feminine name is a diminutive form of the name Jana. The English equivalent of the name is Janice. Pronounced yah-nee-kah. It may refer to:

People
Female:
 Janika Sillamaa (born 1975), Estonian singer and actress
 Janika Vandervelde (born 1955), American composer

Male:
 Janika Balázs (1925–1988), tamburitza musician and band leader from Vojvodina, Serbia

Film
 Janika (film), a 1949 Hungarian comedy film

See also
 Janica